

Subgenus Iris

Bearded rhizomatous irises

Section Iris

 Iris adriatica Trinajstic ex Mitic
 Iris albertii Reg.
 Iris albicans – white cemetery iris, white flag iris
 Iris alexeenkoi Grossh.
 Iris aphylla L. – stool iris, table iris, leafless iris (including I. nudicaulis)
Iris aphylla subsp. hungarica (Waldst. & Kit.) Helgi 
 Iris attica (Boiss. & Heldr.) Hayek
 Iris benacensis A.Kern. ex Stapf
 Iris bicapitata Colas
 Iris croatica – Perunika I.Horvat & M.D.Horvat 
 Iris cypriana Foster & Baker
 Iris flavescens Delile – lemonyellow iris (= I. variegata?)
 Iris furcata Bieb. – forked iris
 Iris × germanica L. – German bearded iris (includes I. × barbata)
 [[Iris florentina|Iris × germanica nothovar. florentina]] Dykes
 Iris glaucescens Bunge
 Iris griffithii Baker
 Iris hellenica Dionysios Mermygkas, Kit Tan & Artemios Yannitsaros
 Iris imbricata Lindl.
 Iris junonia Schott ex Kotschy
 Iris kashmiriana Baker
 Iris lutescens Lam. (including I. italica)

 Iris marsica I.Ricci & Colas.
 Iris mesopotamica – Mesopotamian iris
 Iris orjenii – Orjen iris Bräuchler & Cikovac 
 Iris pallida – sweet iris, Dalmatian iris Lam.
Iris pallida subsp. cengialti (Ambrosi ex A.Kern.) Foster
Iris pallida subsp. illyrica (Iris illyrica) (Tomm. ex Vis.) K.Richt.
 Iris perrieri Simonet ex P.Fourn.
 Iris pseudopumila Tineo
 Iris pumila L.
 Iris purpureobractea B.Mathew & T.Baytop
 Iris relicta Colas.
 Iris reichenbachii Heuff. – Reichenbach's iris
 Iris revoluta Colas.
 Iris sambucina L.
 Iris scariosa Willd. ex Link
 Iris schachtii Markgr.
 Iris setina Colas.
 Iris suaveolens Boiss. & Reut. (including I. iliensis)
 Iris subbiflora Brot.
 Iris taochia Woronow ex Grossh.
 Iris timofejewii Woronow
 Iris variegata L. – Hungarian iris

Section Oncocyclus
 Iris acutiloba C.A.Mey. (including I. ewbankiana)
 Iris antilibanotica  Dinsm.
 Iris assadiana Chaudhary, Kirkw. & C.Weymolauth
 Iris atrofusca Baker
 Iris atropurpurea Baker
 Iris auranitica  Dinsm.
 Iris barnumiae Baker & Foster
 Iris basaltica  Dinsm.
 Iris bismarckiana Reg. – Nazareth Iris
 Iris bostrensis  Mouterde
 Iris camillae Grossh.
 Iris cedreti Dinsm. ex Chaudhary
 Iris damascena Mouterde
 Iris gatesii Foster
 Iris grossheimii Woronow ex Grossh.
 Iris haynei Baker – Gilboa Iris
 Iris hermona Dinsm. – Hermon Iris
 Iris heylandiana Boiss. & Reut.
 Iris iberica Hoffm.
Iris iberica subsp. elegantissima (Sosn.) Fed. & Takht.
Iris iberica subsp. lycotis (Woronow) Takht.
 Iris kirkwoodii (including I. calcarea)
 Iris lortetii Barbey ex Boiss.
 Iris lortetii var. samariae (Dinsm.) Feinbrun
 Iris mariae Barbey.
 Iris meda Stapf
 Iris nigricans  Dinsm.
 Iris nectarifera Güner
 Iris paradoxa Steven
 Iris petrana Dinsm.
 Iris sari Schott ex Bak.
 Iris schelkownikowii Fomin
 Iris sprengeri Siehe
 Iris susiana L. – Mourning Iris
 Iris swensoniana  Chaudhary, G.Kirkw. & C.Weymouth
 Iris westii Dinsm.
 Iris yebrudii Dinsm. ex Chaudhary

Section Hexapogon
 Iris falcifolia Bunge
 Iris longiscapa Ledeb.

Section Psammiris
 Iris arenaria Waldst. & Kit.
 Iris bloudowii Ledeb.
 Iris curvifolia Y.T.Zhao
 Iris humilis Georgi
 Iris kamelinii Alexeeva
 Iris mandshurica Maxim.
 Iris potaninii Maxim.
 Iris vorobievii N.S.Pavlova

Section Pseudoregelia
 Iris cuniculiformis Noltie & K.Y.Guan
 Iris dolichosiphon Noltie
 Iris goniocarpa Bak.
 Iris hookeriana Fost.
 Iris ivanovae Doronkin
 Iris kemaonensis Wall.
 Iris leptophylla Lingelsheim
 Iris narcissiflora  Diels.
 Iris sikkimensis Dykes
 Iris tigridia Bunge ex Ledeb.

Section Regelia
 Iris afghanica Wendelbo
 Iris darwasica Regel
 Iris heweri Grey-Wilson & Mathew
 Iris hoogiana Dykes
 Iris korolkowii Regel
 Iris kuschkensis Grey-Wilson & Mathew
 Iris lineata Foster ex Regel
 Iris stolonifera Maxim.

Subgenus Limniris
Beardless rhizomatous irises
It has been generally divided into 2 sections, 'Limniris', which is further divided down to about 16 series and 'Lophiris' (also known as 'Evansias' or crested iris.

Section Limniris (going in alphabetical order)

Series Californicae  Pacific Coast irises 
Iris bracteata – Siskiyou Iris
Iris chrysophylla – Yellow-leaved Iris
Iris douglasiana – Douglas Iris
Iris fernaldii – Fernald's Iris
Iris hartwegii – Hartweg's Iris, Rainbow Iris, Sierra Iris
Iris innominata – Del Norte Iris
Iris macrosiphon – Bowltube Iris
Iris munzii – Munz's Iris, Tulare Lavender Iris
Iris purdyi – Purdy's Iris
Iris tenax – Tough-leaved Iris, Oregon Iris
Iris tenuissima  Dykes – (Long-tubed Iris)

Series Chinenses (from east Asia) 
Iris henryi Baker
Iris koreana Nakai
Iris minutoaurea Makino
Iris odaesanensis Y.N.Lee
Iris proantha Diels
Iris rossii Baker 
Iris speculatrix Hance

Series Ensatae 
Iris lactea Pall.

Series Foetidissimae 
Iris foetidissima L. – Stinking Iris, Gladwin Iris, Stinking Gladwin, Gladdon, Roast-beef Plant

Series Hexagonae 
(known as the Louisiana irises)
Iris brevicaulis Raf. – Zigzag Iris
Iris fulva Ker-Gawl. – Copper Iris
Iris giganticaerulea – Giant Blue Iris, Giant Blue Flag
Iris hexagona Walt. – Dixie Iris
Iris nelsonii  Randolph – (Abbeville Iris)
Iris savannarum Small – Prairie iris

Series Laevigatae 
(which includes the Japanese irises) 
Iris ensata Thunb. – Japanese Iris, hanashōbu (Japanese) (including I. kaempferi)
Iris laevigata Fisch – Rabbitear Iris, Shallow-flowered Iris, kakitsubata (Japanese)
Iris maackii Maxim.
Iris pseudacorus L. – Yellow Iris, Yellow Flag
Iris versicolor L. – Larger Blue Flag, Harlequin Blueflag
Iris virginica L. – Virginia Iris

Series Longipetalae 
(Rocky Mountain or long-petaled iris) 
Iris longipetala Herb. – (Coast Iris)
Iris missouriensis  – Rocky Mountain Iris, Western Blue Flag

Series Prismaticae 
(contains just one species from America) 
Iris prismaticaPursh ex Ker-Gawl. – (Slender Blue Flag)

Series Ruthenicae
Iris ruthenica Ker-Gawl.
Iris uniflora Pall.

Series Sibiricae
(Siberian irises) 
Iris bulleyana Dykes
Iris chrysographes – Black Iris
Iris clarkei Baker
Iris delavayi Micheli
Iris forrestii Dykes
Iris sanguinea Hornem. ex Donn – Blood Iris, ayame (Japanese)
Iris sibirica – Siberian Iris
Iris typhifolia Kitag.
Iris wilsonii C.H.Wright

Series Spuriae
Iris brandzae Prod.
Iris crocea  Jacquem. ex R.C.Foster (including I. aurea)
Iris graminea L.
Iris halophila Pall.
Iris halophila var. sogdiana (Bunge) Grubov
Iris kerneriana Asch. & Sint.
Iris ludwigii Maxim.
Iris notha M.Bieb.
Iris orientalis Mill. – (Yellow-banded Iris)
Iris pontica  Zapal.
Iris pseudonotha Galushko
Iris sintenisii  Janka
Iris spuria – Blue Iris
Iris spuria subsp. carthaliniae  (Fomin) B.Mathew 
Iris spuria subsp. demetrii  (Achv. & Mirzoeva) B.Mathew 
Iris spuria subsp. maritima (Dykes) P.Fourn. 
Iris spuria subsp. musulmanica  (Fomin) Takht. 
Iris xanthospuria B.Mathew & T.Baytop

Series Syriacae
(species with swollen leaf bases and spiny bristles) 
Iris grant-duffii Baker
Iris masia Foster

Series Tenuifoliae
(mostly semi-desert plants) 
Iris anguifuga Y.T.Zhao & X.J.Xue
Iris bungei Maxim.
Iris cathayensis Migo
Iris farreri Dykes
Iris kobayashii Kitag.
Iris loczyi Kanitz
Iris qinghainica Y.T.Zhao
Iris songarica Schrenk
Iris tenuifolia Pall.
Iris ventricosa Pall.

Series Tripetalae 
(mostly having three petals)  
Iris hookeri Penny – Hooker's Iris
Iris setosa Pallas ex Link – (Beachhead Iris)
Iris tridentata Pursh – Savanna Iris

Series Unguiculares
Iris lazica Albov
Iris unguicularis Poir.

Series Vernae
(contains just one species from America) 
Iris verna L. – Dwarf Violet Iris

Section Lophiris
 Iris confusa – Bamboo Iris
 Iris cristata – Crested Iris
 Iris formosana Ohwi 
 Iris henryi A.Gray
 Iris japonica Thunb.
 Iris lacustris – Dwarf Lake Iris
 Iris latistyla Y.T.Zhao
 Iris milesii Foster 
 Iris speculatrix Hance
 Iris subdichotoma Y.T.Zhao
 Iris tectorum Maxim. – (Wall Iris)
 Iris tenuis S.Wats. – (Clackamas Iris)
 Iris wattii Baker ex Hook.f.

Section Unguiculares
 Iris lazica Albov
 Iris unguicularis Poiret

Unplaced hybrids
 Iris thompsonii R.C.Foster – (Thompson's Iris) (formerly in I. innominata)
 Iris × robusta E.Anderson. – (Robust Iris) (I. versicolor × I. Virginica)
 Iris × sancti-cyriJ.Rousseau – (Saint-Cyr iris) (I. hookeri × I. versicolor)

Subgenus Xiphium
Smooth-bulbed bulbous irises. Formerly genus Xiphion.

Section Xiphium
 Iris boissieri Henriq
 Iris filifolia Boiss.
 Iris juncea Poir.
 Iris latifolia – English Iris
 Iris lusitanica Ker Gawl.
 Iris rutherfordii M Rodriguez,P Vargas,M Carine and S Jury 
 Iris serotina Willk. in Willk. & Lange
 Iris tingitana Boiss. & Reut. – (Morocco Iris)
 Iris xiphium syn. Iris x hollandica – Spanish Iris, Dutch Iris, Small Bulbous-rooted Iris

Subgenus Nepalensis
Bulbous irises. Formerly genus Junopsis.

Section Nepalensis
 Iris collettii Hook.
 Iris decora Wall.
 Iris staintonii H Hara
 Iris barbatula Noltie & Guan

Subgenus Scorpiris
Smooth-bulbed bulbous irises known as "junos". Formerly genus Juno.

Section Scorpiris
 Iris albomarginata R.C.Foster
 Iris aucheri (Baker) Sealy (including I. sindjarensis)
 Iris bucharica Foster
 Iris caucasica Hoffm.
 Iris cycloglossa Wendelbo
 Iris drepanophylla Aitch. & Baker
 Iris fosteriana Aitch. & Baker
 Iris graeberiana Sealy
 Iris kuschakewicziiB.Fedtsch
 Iris magnifica Vved.
 Iris maracandica (Vved.) Wendelbo
 Iris narynensis O.Fedtsch.
 Iris narbutii O.Fedtsch.
 Iris orchioides Carriere

 Iris palaestina (Bak.) Boiss.
 Iris persica L.
 Iris planifolia (Mill.) Fiori & Paol.
 Iris postii Mouterde
 Iris pseudocaucasica Grossh.
 Iris regis-uzziae Feinbrun
 Iris rosenbachiana Reg.
 Iris stenophylla Hausskn ex Baker
 Iris tubergeniana Foster (Vved)
 Iris vicaria Vved.
 Iris warleyensis Foster
 Iris willmottiana Foster
 Iris zaprjagajevii Abramov
 Iris zenaidae Botschant
See more species listed in 'Scorpiris' subgenus.

Subgenus Hermodactyloides

Reticulate-bulbed bulbous irises. Formerly genus Iridodictyum.

Section Hermodactyloides
 Iris danfordiae (Baker) Boiss.
 Iris histrio Rchb.f.
 Iris histrioides (G.F.Wilson) S.Arn.
 Iris hyrcana Woronow ex Grossh
 Iris kolpakowskiana Regel
 Iris pamphylica Hedge
 Iris pskemensis Ruskans
 Iris reticulata M Bieb. (includes Iris reticulata var. bakeriana Mathew and Wendelbo)
 Iris tuberosa L.
 formerly Hermodactylus tuberosus
 Iris vartanii Foster
 Iris winkleri Regel
 Iris winogradowii Fomin

Subgenus Pardanthopsis
 Iris dichotoma Pall. (Vesper iris) (was formerly Pardanthopsis)
 Iris domestica (commonly known as blackberry lily, was once Belamcanda chinensis, but since 2005 now known as Iris domestica)

References 

List
Iris